The Pustnic is a left tributary of the river Olt in Romania. It flows into the Olt near Miercurea Ciuc.

References

Rivers of Romania
Rivers of Harghita County